Bijapur was one of 224 assembly constituencies of the Indian state of Karnataka till 2008. The constituency is readjusted in 2008 on the implementation of the Delimitation Commission of 2002 as Bijapur City Vidhana Sabha constituency. The constituency was a part of the Bombay State before the States Reorganisation Act, 1956.

Members of Legislative Assembly 

* 2008 onwards, see Bijapur City Vidhana Sabha constituency

Election results

After constituency readjustment 
See Bijapur City Vidhana Sabha constituency

Before constituency readjustment

Before renaming of Mysore state to Karnataka

Before States Reorganisation Act, 1956

References 

Former assembly constituencies of Karnataka
Bijapur district, Karnataka